"Half on a Baby" is a song by American R&B singer R. Kelly on his third solo album R.. It was released as the fourth single from the album. It reached the top 20 in the United Kingdom, the Netherlands, and New Zealand. A video was made for the song, coming in at over five minutes long. The song was written and produced by Kelly. The song was originally written for singer Bobby Brown for his 1997 album, Forever, but Brown turned it down.

Music video
The music video was directed by Hype Williams.

Charts

References

External links
https://www.youtube.com/watch?v=ah2ymWRquRo

R. Kelly songs
1998 singles
1998 songs
Songs written by R. Kelly
Song recordings produced by R. Kelly
Music videos directed by Hype Williams